Barkeryd is a village in Nässjö Municipality, Jönköping County, Sweden. It is the site of a church, and the Barkeryd Parish had over 1,000 inhabitants as of 2005.

Populated places in Jönköping County